Robert Leon Wilkie Jr. (born August 2, 1962) is an American lawyer and government official who served as the United States Secretary of Veterans Affairs from 2018 to 2021, during the Trump administration. He was previously Under Secretary of Defense for Personnel and Readiness during the Trump administration, from November 2017 to July 2018. A Naval intelligence in the Reserve, he was Assistant Secretary of Defense for Legislative Affairs in the administration of President George W. Bush.

Early life and education 
Wilkie was born in Frankfurt, West Germany, and attended Salisbury Cathedral School in England, and Reid Ross High School in Fayetteville, North Carolina. The son of a career Army artillery officer, he grew up in Fort Bragg, North Carolina.

Wilkie received his B.A. degree from Wake Forest University in North Carolina. He received a J.D. degree from Loyola University School of Law in New Orleans in 1988 and an LL.M. degree in International and Comparative Law from Georgetown University Law Center in Washington, D.C.

Wilkie served in the United States Navy Reserve; he is currently in the United States Air Force Reserve, where he holds the rank of Colonel.

Career

Congressional staffer and George W. Bush administration official
Wilkie was a longtime Republican congressional staffer. He began his career on Capitol Hill as counsel to Senator Jesse Helms of North Carolina, and later became legislative director for Representative David Funderburk. As a top aide to Helms, Wilkie defended the senator's often-polarizing views.

In 1996, Wilkie unsuccessfully sought for the Republican nomination in North Carolina's 7th congressional district. He was later the executive director of the North Carolina Republican Party at a time Helms was in a contentious reelection fight against Democratic challenger Harvey Gantt. Wilkie defended a pro-Helms mailer that was criticized as racially charged. In 1996, Wilkie also criticized Gantt for having "openly courted money from the homosexual community."

Wilkie then returned to Capitol Hill as counsel and advisor on international security affairs to Senate Majority Leader Trent Lott from 1997 to 2003. In that role, Wilkie led negotiations on the post-September 11 authorization for the use of military force and worked to defeat U.S. ratification of the Comprehensive Nuclear-Test-Ban Treaty. After Lott was ousted as Senate majority leader in 2003 for praising the segregationist presidential campaign of Senator Strom Thurmond in 1948, Wilkie defended Lott's remarks.

From 2003 to 2005, in the George W. Bush administration, Wilkie was special assistant to the President for national security affairs and a senior director of the National Security Council. He was a senior policy advisor to then-National Security Advisor Condoleezza Rice as well as her successor, Stephen Hadley. He later moved to the Pentagon, where in 2007, as assistant secretary of defense for legislative affairs, Wilkie authored a memo outlining guidelines that limited which Defense Department personnel could testify to Congress. Wilkie memo directed that only highest-ranking officers and presidentially appointed civilians could offer congressional testimony, barring all field-grade officers and enlisted personnel from testifying. Critics of the guidelines argued that they could impede investigations of the Iraq War, and that the Pentagon had no authority to set such rules. (The memo did not impact congressional subpoenas, in which Congress can compel any individual to appear).

Wilkie received the Defense Distinguished Public Service Medal, the highest civilian award of the Department.

Private sector and return to congressional staff
From 2010 to 2015, Wilkie was vice president for strategic programs for CH2M Hill, an engineering company. According to his official biography, he worked on reform of Britain's Ministry of Defence supply and logistics system.

From 2015 to 2017, Wilkie was a senior advisor to U.S. Senator Thom Tillis.

In 2019, after the resignation of Jim Mattis, Wilkie lobbied to the Trump White House for an appointment as Secretary of Defense, but was not chosen by President Trump.

Trump administration 
Wilkie worked on the Donald Trump's presidential transition team. President Trump nominated Wilkie to the post of Under Secretary of Defense for Personnel and Readiness in July 2017. The Senate confirmed the nomination by unanimous consent on November 16, 2017.

On March 28, 2018, Trump announced via Twitter that Wilkie would serve as interim Secretary of Veterans Affairs until the Senate confirmed a successor. President Trump nominated Ronny Jackson to be VA secretary, but on May 18, 2018, after Jackson's nomination was withdrawn, President Trump nominated Wilkie to the position. On July 23, 2018, Wilkie's nomination as VA secretary was confirmed by the Senate by an 86–9 vote. He was sworn in on July 30, 2018.

In March 2020, the Trump White House appointed Wilkie to White House Coronavirus Task Force.

VA inspector general investigation and report
The VA Office of Inspector General (IG) determined that Wilkie and his senior staff sought to discredit a woman who reported sexual assaulted by a contractor at the D.C. Medical Center (the flagship VA hospital in Washington, D.C.) and impugn her credibility. The woman, a U.S. Navy veteran and an aide to the House Veterans' Affairs Committee, made the report in the fall of 2019; prosecutors declined to file sexual assault charges.

Wilkie and his senior staff openly questioned the veterans' account and suggested that her report was politically motivated. In February 2020, Wilkie abruptly fired James Byrne from his position of deputy secretary of veterans affairs. The dismissal was a surprise because Bryne had been popular among veterans' groups and was seen as a loyalist to Wilkie.  Wilkie provided little reasoning for the decision, suggesting only that Byrne "who was not jelling with other members of the team." Byrne later said he was fired because he declined to participate in an effort by Wilkie to smear the woman, telling Stars & Stripes, "I've gotten crossways with Wilkie over the [sexual assault] matter by refusing to trash this woman."

In a 68-page report issued in December 2020, VA IG Michael Missal determined that "The tone set by Secretary Wilkie was at minimum unprofessional and at worst provided the basis for VA leaders' attempts to undermine the veteran's credibility" and concluded that "Using denigrating remarks and questioning the credibility of a veteran who reported being sexually assaulted, and then failing to fully explore the facts, is ... contrary to the ongoing missions of improving VA and of serving the veteran community with respect." The IG did not substantiate an allegation that Wilkie had accessed the complainant's military and electronic health records, or asked others to do so, in an attempt to "dig up dirt" on her. Wilkie and his two top press aides gave an interview to the investigators from the VA IG's Office, but refused to sit for follow-up interviews. The IG informed the Justice Department of possible criminal conduct by Wilkie (specifically relating to interference into the assault investigation and perjury during testimony to investigators); the IG did not make a formal criminal referral, and the Justice Department did not charge Wilkie with a crime, reportedly believing the evidence was insufficient.  Wilkie denied all wrongdoing.

After the issuance of the IG report in December 2020, the heads of six major veterans organizations (the American Legion, Veterans of Foreign Wars, Disabled American Veterans, AMVETS, Vietnam Veterans of America, and Paralyzed Veterans of America) called upon President Trump to fire Wilkie from his post. The New York Times editorial board also called for Wilkie to be dismissed.

Pro-Confederate speeches 
In a 1995 speech at the U.S. Capitol, Wilkie called Confederate President Jefferson Davis a "martyr to 'The Lost Cause'" and an "exceptional man in an exceptional age"; in a pro-Confederate event in 2009, Wilkie spoke about Robert E. Lee to the Sons of Confederate Veterans (SCV). He also called abolitionists who opposed slavery "radical", "mendacious", and "enemies of liberty", and stated that the Confederate "cause was honorable," while also condemning slavery as "a stain on our story as it is a stain on every civilization in history". Wilkie is a former member of the SCV and its Confederate Memorial Committee, having been listed as a member at least through 2010; In June 2018, a Defense Department spokesperson said that Wilkie no longer considered himself a member of the group.

During Wilkie's confirmation hearings to be VA secretary, he gave inaccurate answers to Senators regarding the dates of his speaking to Confederate groups. In sworn statements to the Senate as part of the nomination questionnaire, he failed to include his membership in the SCV and omitted his event speeches from responses asking for details on them.

Swastikas on grave markers 
In 2020, the Military Religious Freedom Foundation demanded VA remove three headstones in two VA cemeteries (Fort Sam Houston in Texas and Fort Douglas Post in Utah) that mark the graves of World War II German prisoners of war. The three gravestones at issue featured the Nazi swastikas, the Iron Cross, and tributes to Adolf Hitler ("He died far from his home for the Führer, people and fatherland."). After coming under pressure from Congress to remove the headstones from the national cemeteries, Wilkie initially declined to do so, suggesting that "erasing these headstones removes them from memory"; that "divisive historical figures or events" should be recognized; and that removal would require a lengthy process under the National Historic Preservation Act of 1966. Amid continued pressure, Wilkie reversed himself, and VA quietly removed the grave markers in 2020.

Personal life
He is married to Julia Wilkie, whom he has known since childhood.

References

External links 

|-

|-

|-

|-

1962 births
American lawyers
George W. Bush administration personnel
Georgetown University Law Center alumni
Living people
People educated at Salisbury Cathedral School
People from Fort Bragg, North Carolina
Trump administration cabinet members
United States Air Force officers
United States Air Force reservists
United States Assistant Secretaries of Defense
United States Navy officers
United States Navy reservists
United States Secretaries of Veterans Affairs
United States Under Secretaries of Defense
Virginia Republicans
United States congressional aides
Wake Forest University alumni